Vaccinium membranaceum is a species within the group of Vaccinium commonly referred to as huckleberry.  This particular species is known by the common names thinleaf huckleberry, tall huckleberry, big huckleberry, mountain huckleberry, square-twig blueberry, and (ambiguously) as "black huckleberry".

Distribution and habitat 
Vaccinium membranaceum is native to western North America, with a range extending in the northern from southern Alaska, Yukon, and Northwest Territories south as far as Utah and the northern mountains of California. It can be found from the mountains next to the Pacific Ocean in the west, to the Rocky Mountains and Black Hills in the east.

Isolated populations of this species have been found in Arizona, North Dakota, Minnesota, the Upper Peninsula of Michigan, and Ontario.

Vaccinium membranaceum grows at higher elevations in subalpine and alpine environments. It occurs in both pine and spruce dominated forests and in open meadow ecosystems. In forests V. membranaceum often dominates the forest understory during early to mid stages of succession. Vaccinium membranceum is fire adapted. The leaves and stems of the huckleberry are resistant to low-intensity fires, and if burned away they will resprout vigorously from rhizomes buried under the soil.

Description
The new twigs are yellow-green and somewhat angled. The deciduous leaves are alternately arranged. The very thin to membranous, oval leaf blades are up to 5 centimeters (2 inches) long. The edges are serrated, with each tiny tooth tipped with a glandular hair. Solitary flowers occur in the leaf axils. Each is around 6 millimeters (1/4 inch) long, urn-shaped to cylindrical, and pale pink to waxy bronze in color.

They are pollinated by bees. The mature fruit ranges from red through bluish-purple to a dark, almost black berry about a centimeter wide. Each fruit contains an average of 47 tiny seeds.
 
Reproduction
The plant rarely reproduces via seed, rather, it usually spreads by cloning itself from its rhizome or shoots. The seeds do germinate if dispersed by animals, however, as evidenced by populations of the plant growing on the recovering section of Mount St. Helens. Other than the study by Yang et al. (2008) reports of V. membranaceum sprouting from seed are quite rare with other scientists who have studied this species reporting only 6 seedlings observed during 18 years in the field.

Uses 
Vaccinium membranaceum is the species that is the most commonly collected of all of the wild western huckleberries, and it has great commercial importance.  In a good year Vaccinium membranaceum shrubs produce a lot of fruit. The amount of fruit produced by these shrubs is legendary, with stories being told of mountain sides turned purple by all of the fruit, or shrubs being weighed to the ground by large, and abundant berries

Native Americans
Both humans and wildlife enjoy feasting on this fruit in the late summer and early fall. People have been eating the fruit of this species for thousands of years. It was and continues to be widely used for food by Native Americans. The Kutenai called the black huckleberry shawíash (Ktunaxa: ǂawiyaǂ). Alaska Natives consumed it in bread and pies as a source of vitamin C, the Coeur d'Alene people ate the fruit fresh, dried, mashed, cooked, and added it to soup or froze it for later use, and many other groups relished it and stored it frozen, dried, pressed into cakes, or canned for winter use.

Wildlife
The plant also provides a key food source for black and grizzly bears, which eat the leaves, stems, roots, and fruit. Elk, moose, and white-tailed deer also browse the plant. The thickets provide cover for many species of small animals.

Symbol
The huckleberry is the official state fruit of Idaho, with this particular species assumed to be the huckleberry in question.

Management 
Some Native American groups lit carefully planned controlled burns in wild huckleberry patches to promote fruit production by eliminating competing plants and by stimulating the huckleberry to sprout and spread. Native American groups throughout the Pacific Northwest still utilize this plant as an important cultural food and are active in its management.

See also
Gaylussacia baccata — which shares the common name "black huckleberry"

References

External links

Jepson Manual Treatment of Vaccinium membranaceum
United States Department of Agriculture Plants Profile for Vaccinium membranaceum
Washington Burke Museum, University of Washington
Vaccinium membranaceum — Calphotos Photo gallery, University of California
photo of herbarium specimen at Missouri Botanical Garden, collected in Oregon in 2006

membranaceum
Berries
Flora of Western Canada
Plants described in 1874
Plants used in Native American cuisine
Flora of the Northwestern United States
Flora of the Southwestern United States
Flora of South Dakota
Flora of Michigan
Flora of Ontario
Flora without expected TNC conservation status